Nessi is a surname. Notable people with the surname include:
 Antonio Nessi, Italian engraver, painter and photographer
 Giuseppe Nessi, Italian opera singer
 Lino Nessi, Paraguayan footballer
 Marzio Nessi, experimental physicist at CERN

See also
 NeSSI (New Sampling/Sensor Initiative), a global and open initiative sponsored by the Center for Process Analysis and Control
Nessie (disambiguation)